Strictly Come Dancing: It Takes Two (also known as Strictly: It Takes Two or simply It Takes Two) is a British television programme, the companion show to the popular BBC One programme Strictly Come Dancing. First aired on 25 October 2004, it is broadcast from Monday to Friday during the run of the main show on BBC Two at 6:30 pm.

History
It Takes Two started broadcasting during the second series of the main show in Autumn 2004, replacing the companion show to the first series, Strictly Come Dancing: On Three, which had been broadcast on the digital channel BBC Three and hosted by Justin Lee Collins. Before the 2010 series, BBC Two Scotland did not broadcast the show on Thursdays, when locally produced Gaelic language programming aired in the slot instead, though during the 2008 and 2009 series the Thursday night show was carried as an alternative digital stream via BBC Red Button.

The show was originally hosted by Claudia Winkleman until 2010. In 2011, Zoe Ball took over as host. On 18 April 2019, it was announced that Rylan Clark would be joining the show as a co-host alongside Ball. On 17 May 2021, Ball revealed that she would be leaving the show after 10 years. On 10 June 2021, it was announced on The One Show, that Janette Manrara would be taking over from Ball, hosting alongside Clark.

Format
The programme features interviews and training footage of the couples competing in the main Saturday night show, opinions from the judges on the previous Saturday show and the training footage for the next, and interviews with celebrities who have been watching the show. The show features half-hour episodes each Monday to Thursday, with an extended one-hour episode on Friday in front of a live studio audience. During the show, the presenters are joined each week by regular dance experts, with Ian Waite, Karen Hardy, Neil Jones and Chloe Hewitt all being former contributors.

Presenters scheduling
For the 2019 series, it was announced that Rylan Clark would join the program as a co-host. He would present on Mondays and Tuesdays, interviewing both the leaving pair, and the other pair in the dance-off. Zoe Ball would then present the Wednesday and Thursday shows with Ian Waite and Vicky Gill. Clark and Ball co-presented on Friday, with Gethin Jones remaining as a roving reporter.

This schedule was changed in 2020, with Ball presenting on Mondays, Tuesdays and Wednesdays, and Clark presenting on Thursdays and Fridays. In the 2021 series, with Manrara replacing Ball, Clark was presenting on Mondays, Tuesdays and Fridays while Manrara did so on Wednesdays and Thursdays.

Current segments

Studio segments
 Clifton's Choreography Corner: Every Tuesday (and Monday earlier in the series), a former professional dancer on Strictly Come Dancing reviews the previous week's choreography. They also demonstrate the moves in a mini-segment called 'Demo Time'. Following Karen Hardy's departure in 2017, various former professionals have taken over, including Camilla Dallerup, Joanne Clifton, Natalie Lowe, Erin Boag, Kevin Clifton and Vincent Simone. In 2022, Joanne Clifton took over the role permanently, appearing every week.
 Manrara's Masterclass: Every Wednesday, Janette is joined by a former celebrity contestant to teach viewers (and the It Takes Two crew) some steps from the one of the dances on Strictly. So far, celebrity guests have included Ashley Roberts, Dr. Ranj Singh and Kimberly Walsh. Viewers are invited to send in clips of them attempting the steps to be shown at the start of the following week's masterclass.
 Puttin' on the Glitz: On Thursday, Janette chats with the show's head dress designer Vicky Gill about the costumes that the couples will be wearing that week.
 Friday Panel: On Friday, three or more celebrity fans of the show review music, costumes and training room footage of the celebrities ahead of the Saturday Show. Since 2019, they also predict which couple will be eliminated that week

Other recurring segments
 Strictly Pro Challenge: The professional dancers put various different dance techniques to the test against one another in a yearly competition.

 Global Glitterballs: A look into the various different versions of Strictly Come Dancing from across the globe.
 Strictly CV: One of Strictly Come Dancing's cast members talks through their time on the show, including all of their highlights. Previous guests have included Oti Mabuse, Anton du Beke and Craig Revel Horwood.
 Strictly Pro Down: The professional dancers compete against each other in a series of fun challenges including building the largest marshmallow and stick house and painting with a very long paintbrush. The other pros all attempt to guess who will win.

Previous segments
 Len's Masterclass: Head judge Len Goodman had a weekly spot with Claudia Winkleman, in which he demonstrated the dances to be performed on the following Saturday. This was discontinued when Ball replaced Winkleman as the show's presenter.
 Stat Man: Russell Grant appeared on the 2012 series with a guide to the numbers of winners of Strictly.
 Dance Mat Challenge: The Pro-Dancers were challenged to get on an electronic dance mat and try to top a leaderboard.

In 2013, a new feature was shown, where dancer Natalie Lowe was set a challenge to teach a normal couple, known only as Gordon and Mel from Southampton, how to dance ahead of their wedding.

In 2014, Robin Windsor was set a challenge to teach the teachers of a school to dance for a performance for the school.

A live phone-in segment featured during the autumn 2004 series of the main show, where viewers could speak to the contestants on air.

 Janette and Melvin's Cha Cha Chart Show: Professional dancer Janette Manrara and her 2016 partner Melvin Odoom host a chart-based countdown of various past performances and iconic Strictly moments.
 Ore's Overview: Former champion Ore Oduba gives his say on all the couple's journeys so far.
Booth of Truth: The Strictly professional dancers each enter a booth and are individually asked questions the other pros' personal habits.
 Ballroom Bingo: Professional dancer Anton du Beke asks the pro dancers questions about the other pro dancers.
 Ballas Breakdown: Head judge Shirley Ballas explains and demonstrates steps from the dances.
 Dance Card: Zoe Ball chooses a dance for head judge Shirley to demonstrate.
 Craig's Rev-alations: Every Monday, Judge Craig Revel Horwood reviewed the celebrities previous choreography, performances and training room footage. Though this segment was axed, the chats with Horwood returned for the 2018 series, with him making regular appearances on the Friday show.
 Dance Master: Every Tuesday, renowned dance coach Carmen teaches Rylan the basic steps of one of the dances. As well as this, she explains the background and history of the different styles.
 Waite's Warm-Up: Every Wednesday (and Thursday earlier in the series), Ian Waite reviewed training room footage of the couples so far as they practiced their dances and suggested areas they needed to make improvements.
 It Takes Who: The pros play a game of guess who about each other, revealing some surprising, little-known secrets
 Tunes on Tuesday: On Tuesday, there is usually a sneak peek of some of the songs.

Series overview

Presenters of Strictly: It Takes Two

Studio 
The show has been presented from many venues. In 2017, the programme returned to the newly refurbished Studio TC2 at the Television Centre complex in West London. For the 2018 series, the show was broadcast from The Hospital Club TV Studio in London's Covent Garden, due to ITV Daytime programmes now occupying the Television Centre studios. In 2020, The show moved to Stage 6 at Elstree Studios, the first time It Takes Two has been broadcast from the same studio complex as the main show since 2012.

Ratings 
The show averages between two and three million viewers each evening and is regularly the most watched show of the day on BBC Two.

Notes

References

External links

2004 British television series debuts
2010s British television series
2020s British television series
English-language television shows
It Takes Two
Television series by BBC Studios
Television shows shot at Elstree Film Studios